The Battle of Oxus River was a significant battle in the 7th century, fought between the combined armies of the Sassanid and Göktürk Empires against the Muslim Arab army that had overrun Persia. Following his defeat, the last Sassanid Emperor, Yazdegerd III, became a hunted fugitive who fled to Central Asia and then to China.

Prelude
Khorasan was the second largest province of the Sassanid Persian Empire. It stretched from what is now north-eastern Iran, Afghanistan and Turkmenistan. Its capital was Balkh, now in northern Afghanistan. In 651, the mission of conquering Khurasan was assigned to Ahnaf ibn Qais and Abdullah ibn Aamir. Abdullah marched from Fars and took a short and less frequent route via Rayy. Ahnaf then marched north direct to Merv, in present Turkmenistan. Merv was the capital of Khurasan and here Yazdegerd III held his court. On hearing of the Muslim advance, Yazdegerd III left for Balkh. No resistance was offered at Merv, and the Muslims occupied the capital of Khurasan without a fight.

Battle
Ahnaf stayed at Merv and waited for reinforcement from Kufa. Meanwhile, Yazdegerd had also gathered considerable power at Balkh and also sought alliance with the Khan of Farghana, who personally led the Turkish contingent to help Yazdegerd III. Umar ordered that Yazdegerd’s allied forces should be weakened by breaking up the alliance with the Turks. Ahnaf successfully broke up the alliance and the Khan of Farghana pulled back his forces, realizing that fighting with the Muslims was not a good idea and might endanger his own kingdom. Yazdegerd's army was defeated at the Battle of the Oxus River and retreated across the Oxus to Transoxiana. Yazdegerd III had a narrow escape and fled to China. Balkh was occupied by the Muslims, and with this occupation the Persian war was over. The Muslims had now reached the outermost frontiers of Persia. Beyond that laid the lands of the Turks and still further laid China. The old mighty empire of the Sasanians had ceased to exist.

Aftermath
After being defeated at the Battle of Oxus river, Yazdegerd III was unable to raise another army and became a hunted fugitive. Following the battle, he fled to Central Asia to the court of the Khan of Farghana. From there, Yazdegerd went to China. Nevertheless, Yazdegerd III kept on intruding in Persia, using his influence over the notables and chiefs of Persia, thus remained a motivating force behind the Persian rebellion. During Caliph Uthman's reign, Yadegerd III came back to Bactria and Khorasan rebelled against the Caliphate. Abdullah ibn Aamir crushed the rebellion and defeated Yazdegerd's forces. He fled from one district to another until a local miller killed him for his purse at Merv in 651.

See also
Islamic conquest of Persia
Muslim conquests
Sassanid Empire
Rashidun army

Notes

651
Battles involving the Rashidun Caliphate
Battles involving the Sasanian Empire
650s conflicts
History of Turkmenistan
Muslim conquest of Persia